Moominsummer Madness (Swedish title Farlig midsommar, or "Dangerous Midsummer") is the fifth in the series of Tove Jansson's Moomins books, published in 1954.

The major theme of the novel is theatre, described as an infuriating but ultimately rewarding process.

The novel forms the basis of episodes 28–30 in the 1990 TV series.

Plot summary
A nearby volcano causes a massive wave to flood Moominvalley. While escaping the flood the Moomin family and their friends find a building floating past, and take up residence there. They believe it is a deserted house until they realise someone else lives there, Emma, who explains that it is not a house but a theatre. The moomins start to understand about the scenery, props, and costumes they have found. The theatre drifts aground and Moomintroll and the Snorkmaiden decide to go and sleep in a tree. When they wake next morning the theatre has floated away again and they are alone. Meanwhile, Little My accidentally falls overboard, and by some strange coincidence is rescued by Moomintroll's adventurous friend Snufkin who is setting off to seek revenge on a grumpy Park Keeper. He tears down all the "Do not walk on the grass" notices, fills the lawns with electric Hattifatteners and sets free twenty-four small woodies who immediately adopt him as their father. The coincidences continue as Moonmintroll and the Snorkmaiden meet Emma's deceased husband's niece, the Fillyjonk, and all three get arrested burning the signs that Snufkin tore up.  Meanwhile, in the theatre, Emma helps Moominpappa write a play and the family decide to stage it. The woodies find a playbill for the play and cajole Snufkin into taking them to the theatre. The Hemulen who has arrested Fillyjonk, Moomintroll, and the Snork Maiden also finds a playbill and leaves his cousin to guard the prisoners while he heads off to see the play. The cousin is persuaded of their innocence and lets them out to go to the play too, where everyone is reunited and ends up on stage, the play itself collapsing into a big reunion party. When the floods recede everyone gets to go home.

External links

The Moomin Trove

1954 children's books
1954 fantasy novels
20th-century Finnish novels
Moomin books
Swedish-language novels
Novels about floods
1954 Finnish novels